{{DISPLAYTITLE:C23H31NO3}}
The molecular formula C23H31NO3 (molar mass: 369.50 g/mol, exact mass: 369.2304 u) may refer to:

 Diprafenone
 Norgestimate

Molecular formulas